Neil Paterson (born 9 August 1975) is a professional rugby union referee who represents the Scottish Rugby Union. He now serves as a Television Match Official for the Pro14, and in international matches.

Rugby union career

Playing career

Amateur career

Paterson started playing rugby union in Northern Ireland. He played for Malone RFC in Belfast.

On moving to Scotland, Paterson then turned out for Dundee HSFP. A fly-half, he was top scorer for the club in seasons 2000-01 and 2002-03.

His playing career highlight was captaining the Scottish University team against the English University team. Scotland won the match.

Referee career

Professional career

In Scotland he joined the Midlands Society of the SRU.

His first game in charge was Fife Southern 2XV v Stirling County 3XV in December 2003.

Paterson has refereed in the Scottish Premiership.

He made his Celtic League debut in 2006 when Cardiff Blues played Connacht on 18 November.

He has refereed in the European Challenge Cup, making 29 appearances.

He refereed his first 1872 Cup match on 26 December 2008.

He won the SRU Referee of the Season in 2010-11.

International career

He made his representative debut in 2007 when Czech Republic played Spain.

Outside of rugby

Paterson is a dentist.

References

Living people
Scottish rugby union referees
Rugby union officials
1975 births
1872 Cup referees
Malone RFC players
Dundee HSFP players